Simon Uutoni (born 10 February 1970) is a retired Namibian footballer. He competed for the Namibia national football team from 1997–1998, including the 1998 African Cup of Nations finals. He played as a wing back for local side Liverpool Okahandja.

References

External links

1970 births
Living people
Namibia international footballers
Namibian men's footballers
1998 African Cup of Nations players
Namibia Premier League players
Association football wing halves